The Energy Centre, located in the Central Business District of New Orleans, Louisiana, is a 39-story,  -tall skyscraper designed by HKS, Inc. It is the fourth tallest building in both the city of New Orleans and the state of Louisiana.

A four-story parking garage is adjacent to the tower, one block upriver. The garage is accessible from both Loyola Avenue and South Rampart Street.

The building experienced minor damage during Hurricane Katrina in August 2005. Some windows near the top of the tower were blown out, however, these windows were mostly false windows that cover the climate control systems on the roof. The ceilings of the overhangs on the street level were badly damaged but have since been repaired.

Location
1100 Poydras StreetNew Orleans, LA 70163-1101

The Energy Centre is bounded by the following streets:
 Poydras Street (north)
 South Rampart Street (east)
 Lafayette Street (south)
 Loyola Avenue (west)

See also
 List of tallest buildings in New Orleans
 List of tallest buildings in Louisiana

Skyscraper office buildings in New Orleans
Buildings and structures completed in 1984
HKS, Inc. buildings